DotGears Company Limited (trade name: .Gears) is a Vietnamese video game developer based in Hanoi that specialises in mobile games. The company was founded in 2005 by Dong Nguyen, and is best known for developing the 2013 game Flappy Bird, which became popular due to its simple mechanics but high difficulty. As of December 2015, the company employs six people, including Nguyen.

After releasing multiple games that copied the Flappy Bird mechanics, .Gears partnered with Japanese developer Obokaidem, which the developer maintained would be .Gears' only partner "for the foreseeable future".  In January 2017, the two companies released their first co-developed game, Ninja Spinki Challenges!!, which is nothing like its previous titles and is composed of different mini-games. It uses different mechanics compared to Flappy Bird but is still considered by critics to be equally difficult.

Games developed 
 Ninjas Assault
 Shuriken Block
 Droplet Shuffle
 Smashing Kitty
 Flappy Bird (2013)
 Super Ball Juggling
 Flappy Birds Family (2014)
 Swing Copters (2014)
 Swing Copters 2 (2015)
 Fabitalk (2015)
 Ninja Spinki Challenges!! (2017)
 BOOP (2022)

Notes

References

External links 
 

Companies based in Hanoi
Video game companies established in 2005
Video game companies of Vietnam
Video game development companies
Vietnamese companies established in 2005